The Hirth HM 506 was a six-cylinder air-cooled inverted inline engine that was developed from the earlier four-cylinder HM 504.  The HM 506 was a popular engine for light aircraft of the 1930s to 1940s and powered the Bücker Bü 133A model trainer.  The engine featured a cast magnesium alloy crankcase.

Applications
Bücker Bü 133 A
Fieseler Fi 99
Fieseler Fi 157 (UAV prototype)
Fieseler Fi 158 (UAV prototype)
Gotha Go 241
Klemm Kl 35 B (D-ERLQ)

Specifications (HM 506A)

References

External links
Göbler-Hirthmotoren Company website no historical section
no acces - for sale of Hirth Flugmotoren manuals

Hirth aircraft engines
Air-cooled aircraft piston engines
1930s aircraft piston engines
Inverted aircraft piston engines
Straight-six engines